McClellandtown is an unincorporated community in Fayette County, Pennsylvania, United States. The village was founded by a family of that name, who lived there many years ago. William McClelland, the founder, died there July 12, 1815, in the eighty-second year of his age. The town is located eight miles southwest of Uniontown, and 2.5 miles east of the Monongahela River.

McClellandtown has a volunteer fire department and a post office. The McClellandtown United Presbyterian Church is also located in McClellandtown.

References

Further reading
Ellis, Franklin History of Fayette County, Pennsylvania with Biographical Sketches of Many of Its Pioneers and Prominent Men. L. H. Everts & Co. (1882).

Unincorporated communities in Fayette County, Pennsylvania
Unincorporated communities in Pennsylvania